Sphaenorhynchus bromelicola, the Bahia lime treefrog, is a species of frog in the family Hylidae. It is endemic to eastern Brazil and only known from its type locality near Maracás, Bahia. It is similar to Sphaenorhynchus orophilus.
It lives in terrestrial bromeliads on the forest edge and in open areas. The tadpoles develop in permanent pools. It is abundant at the type locality. Potential threats to this species include habitat loss caused by agriculture, wood plantations, logging, collection of bromeliads and human settlement, though data is insufficient to grant it conservation status.

References

bromelicola
Endemic fauna of Brazil
Amphibians of Brazil
Amphibians described in 1966
Taxonomy articles created by Polbot